Iroko is one of the major towns in Akinyele Local Government Area in Oyo State, Nigeria. The LGA's headquarters are in the town of Moniya

Oyo State